The third season of American crime-comedy-drama television series Castle was ordered on March 30, 2010, by ABC. The season aired from September 20, 2010, to May 16, 2011. The third season was originally ordered with a 22 episode count, but ABC extended the order to 24 episodes on November 11, 2010.

Overview
Richard Castle (Fillion) is a famous mystery novelist who has killed off the main character in his popular book series and has writer's block. He is brought in by the NYPD for questioning regarding a copy-cat murder based on one of his novels. He is intrigued by this new window into crime and murder, and uses his connection with the mayor to charm his way into shadowing Detective Kate Beckett (Katic). Castle decides to use Beckett as his muse for Nikki Heat, the main character of his next book series. Beckett, an avid reader of Castle's books, initially disapproves of having Castle shadow her work, but later warms up and recognizes Castle as a useful resource in her team's investigations.

Cast

Main cast
 Nathan Fillion as Richard Castle
 Stana Katic as Dt. Kate Beckett
 Jon Huertas as Dt. Javier Esposito
 Seamus Dever as Dt. Kevin Ryan
 Tamala Jones as Dr. Lanie Parish
 Ruben Santiago-Hudson as Captain Roy Montgomery
 Molly C. Quinn as Alexis Castle
 Susan Sullivan as Martha Rodgers

Recurring cast
 Victor Webster as Josh Davidson 
 Ken Baumann as Ashley Linden 
 Jason Beghe as Mike Royce 
 Scott Paulin as Jim Beckett 
 Max Martini as Hal Lockwood 
 Adrian Pasdar as Mark Fallon 
 Brian Goodman as Gary McCallister 
 Lochlyn Munro as Kevin McCann 
 Judith Scott as Evelyn Montgomery
 Arye Gross as Sidney Perlmutter
 Juliana Dever as Jenny Duffy-O'Malley

Episodes

Reception

Critical reception
The third season of Castle received mixed to positive reviews from critics. The season received a 60% fresh rating on Rotten Tomatoes, based on 5 reviews. Courtney Morrison from TV Fanatic praised the season finale, calling it "easily one of the best Castle episodes yet" and was impressed over the entire cast in the episode. However, the third season was criticized for being too average. The A.V. Club reviewer called the show "This is a cute piece of work that coasts largely on the charms of its cast". Michael Crider from Screenrant was also negative towards the show's premise as he said "Without the light-hearted and even flirty back-and-forth, there’s not a whole lot to distinguish Castle from any mystery made in the last twenty years".

DVD release

Awards and nominations

References

2010 American television seasons
2011 American television seasons
Season 3